The 1998–99 Danish Superliga season was the 9th season of the Danish Superliga league championship, governed by the Danish Football Association. It took place from the first match on July 26, 1998, to final match on June 16, 1999.

The Danish champions and runners-up qualified for their respective UEFA Champions League qualification stages, while the third placed team qualified for the qualification round of the 1999–2000 UEFA Cup. The fourth and fifth placed teams qualified for the UEFA Intertoto Cup 1999, while the two lowest placed teams of the tournament were directly relegated to the Danish 1st Division. Likewise, the Danish 1st Division champions and runners-up were promoted to the Superliga.

Table

Results

Top goalscorers

See also
 1998-99 in Danish football

External links
  Fixtures at NetSuperligaen.dk
  Peders Fodboldstatistik

Danish Superliga seasons
1998–99 in Danish football
Denmark